Renaud Cohade (born 29 September 1984) is a French former professional footballer who played as a midfielder.

Career
In July 2016, Cohade signed a three-year contract with FC Metz after playing four seasons for AS Saint-Étienne.

In May 2020, with his FC Metz contract running out in June, Cohade was linked with a move to Toulouse FC. By January 2021, he was still without a club with Cohade stating he would likely retire.

By March 2022 Cohade had retired from playing.

Honours
Saint-Étienne
 French League Cup: 2012–13

References

External links
 

1984 births
Living people
People from Aubenas
Sportspeople from Ardèche
French footballers
Footballers from Auvergne-Rhône-Alpes
Association football midfielders
Ligue 1 players
Ligue 2 players
Championnat National players
Nîmes Olympique players
FC Girondins de Bordeaux players
FC Sète 34 players
RC Strasbourg Alsace players
Valenciennes FC players
AS Saint-Étienne players
FC Metz players